The 1946 World Professional Basketball Tournament was the 8th edition of the World Professional Basketball Tournament. It was held in Chicago, Illinois, during the days of 25 March - 8 April 1946 and featured 14 teams. It was won by the Fort Wayne Zollner Pistons who defeated the Oshkosh All-Stars 2–1 in the championship series. The Chicago American Gears came in third after beating the Baltimore Bullets 2–0 in the third-place best-of-three series. George Mikan of the American Gears was named the tournament's Most Valuable Player after finishing as its top scorer with 100 points in five games.

Results

First round
25 March - Chicago American Gears 69, Pittsburgh Raiders 58
25 March - Anderson Duffey Packers 59, Cleveland Allmen Transfers 46
25 March - Midland Dow Chemicals 72, Indianapolis Kautskys 59
25 March - Oshkosh All-Stars 60, Detroit Mansfields 32
25 March - New York Rens 82, Toledo White Huts 39
25 March - Baltimore Bullets 61, Dayton Mickeys 58

Quarter-finals
 29 March - Oshkosh All-Stars 50, New York Rens 44
 29 March - Chicago American Gears 52, Sheboygan Redskins 51
 29 March - Fort Wayne Zollner Pistons 65, Midland Dow Chemicals 62
 29 March - Baltimore Bullets 67, Anderson Duffey Packers 65

Semi-finals
3 April - Fort Wayne Zollner Pistons 50, Baltimore Bullets 49
3 April - Oshkosh All-Stars 72, Chicago American Gears 66

Third place series

Championship series

Individual awards

All-Tournament First team
F - Jerry Bush, Fort Wayne Zollner Pistons 
F - Leroy Edwards, Oshkosh All-Stars
C - George Mikan, Chicago American Gears (MVP)
G - Bobby McDermott, Fort Wayne Zollner Pistons
G - Bob Feerick, Oshkosh All-Stars

All-Tournament Second team
F - Paul Cloyd, Midland Dow Chemicals 
F - Bob Calihan, Chicago Gears
C - Mike Bloom, Baltimore Bullets
G - Stan Stutz, Baltimore Bullets
G - Bob Carpenter, Oshkosh All-Stars

References

External links
WPBT 1939-48 on apbr.org

World Professional Basketball Tournament